Douglas Aarniokoski (born August 25, 1965) is an American television director and producer.

He is well known for his work on the CBS series Star Trek: Discovery,  Star Trek: Short Treks, Star Trek: Picard, Criminal Minds, S.W.A.T., and The CW superhero drama Arrow. He has also worked on FOX supernatural series Sleepy Hollow.

Career
Aarniokoski got his start as a production assistant on Turner & Hooch and as a personal assistant to Tom Cruise on his 1990 film Days of Thunder. He then worked on the 1992 horror feature Doctor Mordrid, as the first assistant director. He went on to serve as assistant director on several other films such as From Dusk till Dawn, Living Out Loud, The Faculty, and Spy Kids.

Later he began serving as a second unit director for features such as The Medallion, Once Upon a Time in Mexico, and Resident Evil: Extinction.

His directorial debut was with the 2000 action film Highlander: Endgame. His other credits include Animals and The Day.

He co-wrote and directed the 2013 horror Nurse 3D.

Aarniokoski has directed 8 installments of the CBS series Criminal Minds since 2011, while directing two episodes of The CW's Green Arrow origin series Arrow and one of its sister-series, The Flash.

Sleepy Hollow
During the first season of the FOX series Sleepy Hollow, Aarniokoski directed the 7th episode, "The Midnight Ride". In winter 2014, he joined as supervising producer and main director on the show. He has since directed the second-season episodes "Go Where I Send Thee...", "And the Abyss Gazes Back", "Kali Yuga" and "Awakening".

Limitless
In 2015, he joined the new CBS series Limitless, as supervising producer and director. The show will be run by former Sleepy Hollow co-worker Mark Goffman.

Filmography

Television

Acting credits

References

External links

1965 births
American television directors
American people of Finnish descent
Living people
Businesspeople from San Francisco
Film directors from San Francisco